The 2022 Imola FIA Formula 2 round was a motor racing event held between 22 and 24 April 2022 at the Autodromo Internazionale Enzo e Dino Ferrari. It was the third round of the 2022 FIA Formula 2 Championship and was held in support of the 2022 Emilia Romagna Grand Prix.

Classification

Qualifying 
Jüri Vips took his maiden pole position of his FIA Formula 2 career for Hitech Grand Prix, ahead of Ayumu Iwasa and Jack Doohan.

Notes:
 – Enzo Fittipaldi and Jake Hughes received three-place grid penalties for impeding another driver during qualifying. All three drivers had one penalty point added to their license.

Sprint Race 

Notes:
 – Amaury Cordeel could not participate at the Sprint Race after a crash in the formation lap.

Feature Race

Standings after the event 

Drivers' Championship standings

Teams' Championship standings

 Note: Only the top five positions are included for both sets of standings.

See also 
 2022 Emilia Romagna Grand Prix
 2022 Imola Formula 3 round

References

External links 
 Official website

|- style="text-align:center"
|width="35%"|Previous race:
|width="30%"|FIA Formula 2 Championship2022 season
|width="40%"|Next race:

Imola
Imola
Imola